This is a list of Lutheran dioceses and archdioceses currently active, grouped by national (or regional) church, and showing the titles of the bishops of those dioceses. Where relevant, the metropolitan bishop or primate is listed first. As in other Christian denominations, many Lutheran metropolitan bishops and primate bishops bear the title archbishop.

This list does not contain historical or defunct dioceses, although links are provided (at the end of the list) to former Lutheran dioceses of particular historical note.

This list is solely for dioceses of those Lutheran churches which have retained, or established, episcopal polity. There are also many Lutheran churches with congregational polity, which do not have bishops, or who use the title bishop for their presiding officer, but in a sense other than that of the historic episcopate.

Europe (outside Germany)

Church of Denmark
An established state church in Denmark and Greenland. The Bishop of Copenhagen is the Primate (Primus inter pares), but not a Metropolitan, having no actual jurisdiction superior to that of any other diocesan bishop.
Bishop of Copenhagen (Primate, but with no authority as Metropolitan)
Bishop of Aalborg
Bishop of Århus
Bishop of Fyen
Bishop of Greenland
Bishop of Haderslev
Bishop of Helsingør
Bishop of Lolland-Falster
Bishop of Ribe
Bishop of Roskilde
Bishop of Viborg

Estonian Evangelical Lutheran Church
The Archbishop holds authority throughout Estonia, assisted by Bishops of regional dioceses, including the Extra-Estonian Diocese, which had been a separate church until 2010. The College of Bishops is usually larger, due to the practice of giving most retiring Bishops the status of Bishop Emeritus (or Archbishop Emeritus).
Archbishop of Tallinn (Primate and Metropolitan) (See located at Tallinn)
Bishop of the Western and Northern Region (See located at Haapsalu)
Bishop of the Southern Region (See located at Tartu)

Church of the Faroe Islands
Formerly a diocese of the Church of Denmark, it is now an autonomous church consisting of a single diocese.
Bishop of the Faroe Islands

Evangelical Lutheran Church of Finland
One of two state sanctioned national churches in Finland. The Archbishop of Turku is the Primate. In addition to the dioceses listed below there is also a "Military Bishopric", although the Ordinary is not required to be in Bishop's Orders, and may be a senior priest.
Archbishop of Turku (Primate and Metropolitan)
Bishop of Turku (suffragan bishop, assisting the Archbishop of Turku)
Bishop of Espoo
Bishop of Helsinki
Bishop of Kuopio
Bishop of Lapua
Bishop of Mikkeli
Bishop of Oulu
Bishop of Porvoo
Bishop of Tampere

A small group of former members of ELCF have formed an independent conservative mission diocese, the Evangelical Lutheran Mission Diocese of Finland. It is headed by its own bishop, but is not recognised by the ELCF, the Finnish Government, or the Lutheran World Federation.

Lutheran Church in Great Britain
An autonomous church structured as a single diocese.
Bishop of Great Britain

Evangelical-Lutheran Church in Hungary
The church is led by a Presiding Bishop, who is elected from amongst the diocesan bishops, and remains a diocesan bishop in addition to his role as Primate.
 Presiding Bishop (Primate and Metropolitan) – no fixed see, elected from amongst the diocesan bishops below
 Bishop of the Northern Diocese
 Bishop of the Southern Diocese
 Bishop of the Western (Transdanubian) Diocese

National Church of Iceland
Since 1801 the Church of Iceland has been united as a single diocese. Since that year, the Bishops of Skálholt and Hólar have been suffragans to the Bishop of Iceland. They retain their respective cathedras (seats) in Skálholt Cathedral and Hólar Cathedral. The Bishop of Iceland's cathedra is located in Reykjavík Cathedral.
Bishop of Iceland
Bishop of Skálholt 
Bishop of Hólar

Evangelical Lutheran Church of Latvia
The Council of Bishops (of which all Latvian bishops and archbishops are members) is the highest authority in the church; the archbishop is Primate and is sometimes styled Archbishop of Riga and Latvia.
Archbishop of Riga (Primate and Metropolitan)
Bishop of Riga (suffragan bishop, assisting the Archbishop of Riga)
Bishop of Daugavpils
Bishop of Liepāja

Latvian Evangelical Lutheran Church Abroad
An autonomous church formed as a single diocese, and operating worldwide. Originally for Latvians overseas, the church now has congregations in Latvia also, where its inclusive ordination policy contrasts with the Evangelical Lutheran Church of Latvia, which ordains only men.
Archbishop of the LELCA

Evangelical Lutheran Church of Lithuania
An autonomous church structured as a single diocese.
Bishop of Lithuania

Church of Norway
Changes in 2012 and 2016 have given the church increased autonomy from the state, although it remains partially state-funded. The Preses (Presiding Bishop) is the primate and metropolitan and also has Ordinary jurisdiction over the cathedral deanery in Nidaros (Trondheim), notwithstanding the existence of a Diocesan Bishop of Nidaros (see below).
Bishop Preses (Primate and Metropolitan)
Bishop of Agder og Telemark
Bishop of Bjørgvin
Bishop of Borg
Bishop of Hamar
Bishop of Møre
Bishop of Nidaros
Bishop of Nord-Hålogaland
Bishop of Oslo
Bishop of Tunsberg
Bishop of Sør-Hålogaland
Bishop of Stavanger

Evangelical Augsburg Church in Poland
The Primate is styled Bishop of the Church and is based in Warsaw.
Bishop of the Church (Primate and Metropolitan)
Bishop of Cieszyn
Bishop of Katowice
Bishop of Masuria
Bishop of Pomerania-Greater Poland
Bishop of Warsaw
Bishop of Wrocław

Evangelical Lutheran Church in Russia, Ukraine, Kazakhstan and Central Asia (ELCROS)
With its origins in several separate denominations within the former Soviet Union, this has been a united church since 1999. The Primate is based in St Petersburg.
 Archbishop of St. Petersburg (Russia) (Primate)
 Bishop of Evangelical-Lutheran Church in European Russia (Russia) (Cathedral in Moscow)
 Bishop of Evangelical-Lutheran Church of the Urals, Siberia and the Far East (Russia)
 Bishop of Union of Evangelical-Lutheran Church Congregations in Belorussia (Belarus)
 Bishop of Evangelical-Lutheran Church in Georgia (Georgia)
 Bishop of Evangelical-Lutheran Church in Kazakhstan (Kazakhstan)
 Bishop of Evangelical-Lutheran Church in the Kyrgyz Republic (Kyrgyzstan)
 Bishop of Evangelical-Lutheran Church in Uzbekistan (Uzbekistan)
 Bishop of German Evangelical-Lutheran Church in the Ukraine (Ukraine)

Evangelical Lutheran Church of Ingria in Russia (ELCI)
A single-diocese church. Unlike ELCROS (above) the ELCI does not ordain women.
 Bishop of the ELCI

Church of Sweden
The largest Lutheran church in Europe. The Archbishop of Uppsala is the primate and metropolitan; although also the Ordinary (diocesan bishop) of Uppsala, much of this work is legally delegated to the Bishop of Uppsala, a suffragan bishop who functions as the effective diocesan bishop. There are 13 dioceses (listed below). Additionally the Church of Sweden Abroad forms a 14th jurisdiction, consisting of 45 churches, in 3 deaneries, all outside Sweden; it is under the episcopal oversight of the Bishop of Visby.
Archbishop of Uppsala (Primate and Metropolitan)
Bishop of Uppsala (suffragan bishop with extensive delegated authority from the Archbishop)
Bishop of Gothenburg
Bishop of Härnösand
Bishop of Karlstad
Bishop of Linköping
Bishop of Luleå
Bishop of Lund
Bishop of Skara
Bishop of Stockholm
Bishop of Strängnäs
Bishop of Visby
Bishop of Västerås
Bishop of Växjö

Germany

United Evangelical Lutheran Church of Germany

VELKD, established in 1948. All member churches are also members of the all-Protestant umbrella EKD. Only Lutheran member churches are listed below.

Single-diocese member churches
State Bishop in Bavaria (Evangelical Lutheran Church in Bavaria) (Seat located in Munich)
Six regional bishops lead regions of the Bavarian diocese
State bishop in Brunswick (Evangelical Lutheran State Church in Brunswick) (Seat located in Brunswick)
State Bishop of Hanover (Evangelical-Lutheran State Church of Hanover) (Seat located in Hanover)
State bishop of the Evangelical Church in Middle Germany (Evangelical Church in Middle Germany)
State bishop of Saxony (Evangelical Lutheran State Church of Saxony) (Seat located in Meissen)
State bishop of Schaumburg-Lippe (Evangelical Lutheran State Church of Schaumburg-Lippe) (Seat located in Bückeburg)

Evangelical Lutheran Church in Northern Germany
Established in 2012 from unions of several older denominations, and also part of the VELKD, but consisting of multiple internal dioceses. The State Bishop or Presiding Bishop is in overall charge. There are currently two Bishops of Mecklenburg and Pomerania (located respectively at Greifswald and Schwerin), but this is a temporary arrangement following mergers of denominations.
Presiding bishop of the Evangelical Lutheran Church in Northern Germany. (Primate) (Seat located in Schwerin)
Bishop of Hamburg and Lübeck (Seat located in Hamburg)
Bishops of Mecklenburg and Pomerania. (Double staff seat located in Greifswald and Schwerin)
Bishop of Schleswig and Holstein

Evangelical Lutheran Church in Oldenburg
Bishop of Oldenburg (Seat located in Oldenburg in Oldenburg)

Evangelical State Church in Württemberg
The Presiding Bishop (or State Bishop) is in overall charge, with the diocese divided into regions, which function as small dioceses.
Presiding bishop of Württemberg (Seat located in Stuttgart)
 Regional Bishop of Heilbronn
 Regional Bishop of Stuttgart
 Regional Bishop of Ulm
 Regional Bishop of Reutlingen

Asia

United Evangelical Lutheran Churches in India
A group of Indian bishoprics with very different origins and founders, which retain their autonomy, but have united into a single denomination.
 Bishop of Tranquebar (Tamil Evangelical Lutheran Church)
 Bishop of the Andhra Evangelical Lutheran Church
 Bishop of the Evangelical Lutheran Church in Madhya Pradesh
 Bishop of the Gossner Evangelical Lutheran Church in Chotanagpur and Assam
 Bishop of the Jeypore Evangelical Lutheran Church
 Bishop of the South Andhra Lutheran Church

Evangelical Lutheran Church in Jordan and the Holy Land
A single-diocese church operating in Jordan, Israel, and Palestine.
 Bishop of the Evangelical Lutheran Church in Jordan and the Holy Land

Evangelical Lutheran Church in Malaysia
A single-diocese church operating in Malaysia. The Bishop's seat is located at Zion Cathedral, Brickfields, Kuala Lumpur.
 Bishop of the Evangelical Lutheran Church in Malaysia

North America

Evangelical Lutheran Church in America
The ELCA does not have dioceses in the usual sense. However, its "synods" increasingly closely resemble a diocese in all but name, particularly since the decision in 2000 to appoint all new bishops within the historic apostolic succession, with the laying-on of hands by at least three current bishops.

 Presiding Bishop of the Evangelical Lutheran Church in America
Region 1:
Bishop of the Alaska Synod
Bishop of the Northwest Washington Synod
Bishop of the Southwestern Washington Synod
Bishop of the Eastern Washington-Idaho Synod
Bishop of the Oregon Synod
Bishop of the Montana Synod
Region 2:
Bishop of the Sierra Pacific Synod
Bishop of the Southwest California Synod
Bishop of the Pacifica Synod
Bishop of the Grand Canyon Synod
Bishop of the Rocky Mountain Synod
Region 3:
Bishop of the Western North Dakota Synod
Bishop of the Eastern North Dakota Synod
Bishop of the South Dakota Synod
Bishop of the Northwestern Minnesota Synod
Bishop of the Northeastern Minnesota Synod
Bishop of the Southwestern Minnesota Synod
Bishop of the Minneapolis Area Synod
Bishop of the Saint Paul Area Synod
Bishop of the Southeastern Minnesota Synod
Region 4:
Bishop of the Nebraska Synod
Bishop of the Central States Synod
Bishop of the Arkansas-Oklahoma Synod
Bishop of the Northern Texas-Northern Louisiana Synod
Bishop of the Southwestern Texas Synod
Bishop of the Texas-Louisiana Gulf Coast Synod
Region 5:
Bishop of the Metropolitan Chicago Synod
5Bishop of the Northern Illinois Synod
Bishop of the Central/Southern Illinois Synod
Bishop of the Southeastern Iowa Synod
Bishop of the Western Iowa Synod
Bishop of the Northeastern Iowa Synod
Bishop of the Northern Great Lakes Synod
Bishop of the Northwest Synod of Wisconsin
Bishop of the East Central Synod of Wisconsin
Bishop of the Greater Milwaukee Synod
Bishop of the South-Central Synod of Wisconsin
Bishop of the La Crosse Area Synod
Region 6:
Bishop of the Southeast Michigan Synod
Bishop of the North/West Lower Michigan Synod
Bishop of the Indiana-Kentucky Synod
Bishop of the Northwestern Ohio Synod
Bishop of the Northeastern Ohio Synod
Bishop of the Southern Ohio Synod
Region 7:
Bishop of the New Jersey Synod
Bishop of the New England Synod
Bishop of the Metropolitan New York Synod
Bishop of the Upstate New York Synod
Bishop of the Northeastern Pennsylvania Synod
Bishop of the Southeastern Pennsylvania Synod
Bishop of the Slovak Zion Synod
Region 8:
Bishop of the Northwestern Pennsylvania Synod
Bishop of the Southwestern Pennsylvania Synod
Bishop of the Allegheny Synod
Bishop of the Lower Susquehanna Synod
Bishop of the Upper Susquehanna Synod
Bishop of the Delaware-Maryland Synod
Bishop of the Metropolitan Washington, D.C. Synod
Bishop of the West Virginia-Western Maryland Synod
Region 9:
Bishop of the Virginia Synod
Bishop of the North Carolina Synod
Bishop of the South Carolina Synod
Bishop of the Southeastern Synod
Bishop of the Florida-Bahamas Synod
Bishop of the Caribbean Synod

Evangelical Lutheran Diocese of North America
 Bishop of the Evangelical Lutheran Diocese of North America

Evangelical Lutheran Church in Canada
 National Bishop of the Evangelical Lutheran Church in Canada

Africa

Evangelical Lutheran Church in Kenya
The Archbishop is the primate, and is also responsible for a small diocese, comprising his cathedral in Nairobi and its immediate surrounding precincts.
 Archbishop of Uhuru Highway Cathedral Diocese (Primate and Metropolitan)
 Bishop of South West Diocese
 Bishop of Lake Diocese
 Bishop of Central Diocese
 Bishop of North West Diocese
 Bishop of Nyamira Diocese

United Church Council of the Lutheran Churches in Namibia
Namibia's three Lutheran denominations have a long history of co-operation together, and in 2007 formed the United Church Council as a parent body, within which they are working towards full visible unity as a single church.

Evangelical Lutheran Church in Namibia
Working predominantly in the north of the country.
 Presiding Bishop (Primate, elected position held by one of the diocesan bishops.)
 Bishop of the Western Diocese
 Bishop of the Eastern Diocese

Evangelical Lutheran Church in the Republic of Namibia
Working predominantly in the south of the country.
 Bishop of the ELCRN

German-speaking Evangelical Lutheran Church in Namibia
Working nationwide amongst the German-speaking community.
 Bishop of the GELC

Lutheran Church of Christ in Nigeria
The Archbishop is not part of a formally constituted diocese, although he holds jurisdiction over a national arch-cathedral in Numan, which is also the location of the church's administrative headquarters.
 Archbishop of the LCC in Nigeria (Primate and Metropolitan)
 Bishop of Abuja
 Bishop of Arewa
 Bishop of Bonotem
 Bishop of Gongola
 Bishop of Mayo-Belwa
 Bishop of ShallHolma
 Bishop of Todi
 Bishop of Taraba
 Bishop of Yola

Evangelical Lutheran Church in Southern Africa
The largest Lutheran church in southern Africa is headed by a Presiding Bishop. It operates in South Africa, Botswana, Eswatini, and Lesotho. In addition to the dioceses listed below there is also a Lesotho mission area, not yet large enough to be formed into a diocese.
 Presiding Bishop (Primate and Metropolitan) – no fixed see, elected from amongst the diocesan bishops below
 Bishop of Botswana Diocese
 Bishop of Cape Orange Diocese
 Bishop of Central Diocese
 Bishop of Eastern Diocese
 Bishop of Northern Diocese
 Bishop of South Eastern Diocese
 Bishop of Western Diocese

Evangelical Lutheran Church in Tanzania
The Presiding Bishop is the primate, and may be elected from amongst all the diocesan bishops. There is no fixed see for the Presiding Bishop.
 Presiding Bishop (Primate and Metropolitan) – no fixed see, elected from amongst the diocesan bishops below
 Bishop of Central Diocese
 Bishop of Dodoma Diocese
 Bishop of East of Lake Victoria Diocese
 Bishop of Eastern and Coastal Diocese
 Bishop of Iringa Diocese
 Bishop of Karagwe Diocese
 Bishop of Konde Diocese
 Bishop of Lake Tanganyika Diocese
 Bishop of Mara Diocese
 Bishop of Mbulu Diocese
 Bishop of Meru Diocese
 Bishop of Morogoro Diocese
 Bishop of Mwanga Diocese
 Bishop of Northern Diocese
 Bishop of North-Central Diocese
 Bishop of North-Eastern Diocese
 Bishop of North-Western Diocese
 Bishop of Pare Diocese
 Bishop of Ruvuma Diocese
 Bishop of Southern Diocese
 Bishop of South-Central Diocese
 Bishop of South-East of Lake Victoria Diocese
 Bishop of South-Eastern Diocese
 Bishop of South-Western Diocese
 Bishop of Ulanga Kilombero Diocese

Former bishoprics of historic note 
Bishopric of Samland
Bishopric of Pomesania

See also 
List of Anglican dioceses and archdioceses
List of Orthodox dioceses and archdioceses
List of bishops of the United Methodist Church
List of Unitarian bishops
List of current patriarchs
List of Catholic dioceses (structured view)
List of Catholic dioceses (alphabetical)
List of Roman Catholic archdioceses

References 

Dioceses
Dioceses
 
Dioceses
Lutheran